Prudencio de Pena Gómez (born 21 January 1913 in Montevideo, Uruguay; date of death unknown) was an Uruguayan basketball player who competed in the 1936 Summer Olympics. De Pena was part of the Uruguay national basketball team, which finished sixth in the Olympic tournament. He played one match.

External links

1913 births
Year of death missing
Basketball players at the 1936 Summer Olympics
Olympic basketball players of Uruguay
Uruguayan men's basketball players
Uruguayan people of Spanish descent
Sportspeople from Montevideo